In mathematics, particularly in functional analysis and convex analysis, the Ursescu theorem is a theorem that generalizes the closed graph theorem, the open mapping theorem, and the uniform boundedness principle.

Ursescu Theorem 

  if  is barreled for some/every  while  otherwise.
 Note that  is convex if and only if for all  and all  
 If  is a function, then its inverse is the set-valued function  obtained from canonically identifying  with the set-valued function  defined by 

Statement

Corollaries

Closed graph theorem

Uniform boundedness principle

Open mapping theorem

Additional corollaries 

The following notation and notions are used for these corollaries, where  is a set-valued function,  is a non-empty subset of a topological vector space :
If  converges then the series is called convergent while if  is bounded then the series is called bounded and b-convex.
  is ideally convex if any convergent b-convex series of elements of  has its sum in 
  is lower ideally convex if there exists a Fréchet space  such that  is equal to the projection onto  of some ideally convex subset B of  Every ideally convex set is lower ideally convex.

Related theorems

Simons' theorem

Robinson–Ursescu theorem 

The implication (1)  (2) in the following theorem is known as the Robinson–Ursescu theorem.

See also

Notes

References

  
 

Theorems involving convexity
Theorems in functional analysis